Mingo Run is a stream in Randolph County, West Virginia, in the United States.

Mingo Run was so named on account of it being a favorite camping ground of the Mingo Indians.

See also
List of rivers of West Virginia

References

Rivers of Randolph County, West Virginia
Rivers of West Virginia